Sinaspideretes is an extinct genus of turtle from the Late Jurassic of China, probably from the Shaximiao Formation. It is considered the earliest and most basal representative of the Trionychia, and is possibly the oldest known member of Cryptodira. In 2013, it was proposed that this animal and the genus Yehguia are infact one and the same.

References

Sources
 The Age of Dinosaurs in Russia and Mongolia by Michael J. Benton, Mikhail A. Shishkin, David M. Unwin, and Evgenii N. Kurochkin
 Chinese Fossil Vertebrates by Spencer G. Lucas

Trionychidae
Late Jurassic turtles
Late Jurassic reptiles of Asia
Jurassic China
Prehistoric turtle genera
Extinct turtles